Alte Emscher is a river of North Rhine-Westphalia, Germany. It is the former lower course of the Emscher. It flows into the Rhine near Hamborn (Duisburg).

See also
List of rivers of North Rhine-Westphalia

Rivers of North Rhine-Westphalia
Rivers of Germany